The following is a list of notable events and releases of the year 2012 in Norwegian music.

Events

January
 25 – Bodø Jazz Open started in Bodø (January 25–28).
 27
 Nordlysfestivalen started in Tromsø (January 27 – February 4).
 Inga Juuso (vocals) was awarded the Nordlysprisen 2012 at Nordlysfestivalen.

February
 1 – The Polarjazz Festival 2012 started in Longyearbyen (February 1 – 5).
 2 – Kristiansund Opera Festival opened (February 2 – 18).

March
 9 – Narvik Winter Festival started (March 9 – 18).
 30 – Vossajazz started in Voss (March 30 – April 2).
 31
 Sigrid Moldestad was awarded Vossajazzprisen 2012.
 Karl Seglem performs the commissioned work Som Spor at Vossajazz.

April
 25 – SoddJazz 2012 started in Inderøy, Nord-Trøndelag (April 25–29).

May
 5 – Mathias Eick Quintet was recipient of the BMW Welt Jazz Award 2012.
 23
 Festspillene i Bergen starts (May 23 – June 6)
 Nattjazz starts in Bergen (May 23 – June 2)

June
 14 – Norwegian Wood 2012 started in Oslo, Norway (June 14 – 17).
 21 – Bergenfest 2012 started in Bergen (June 21–24).

July
 4 – Kongsberg Jazzfestival started at Kongsberg (July 4–7).
 7 – Ola Kvernberg was recipient of the Kongsberg Jazz Award or DNB.prisen 2012 at the Kongsberg Jazzfestival.
 16 – Moldejazz started in Molde with Jon Balke as artist in residence (July 16–21).
 17
 Mopti was awarded the JazzIntro 2012.
 Anja Eline Skybakmoen was awarded the Jazztalent 2012.
 Albatrosh was awarded the JazZtipendiat 2012.

August
 13
 Oslo Jazzfestival started in Oslo (August 13–18).
 Bugge Wesseltoft was recipient of the Ella-prisen 2012 at the Oslo Jazzfestival.

September
 6 – Punktfestivalen started in Kristiansand (September 6 – 8).

October
 22 – The Ekkofestival started in Bergen (October 22 – November 3).
 25 – The Insomnia Festival started in Tromsø (October 25 – 27).
 30 – The Oslo World Music Festival started in Oslo (October 30 – November 4).

November
 14 – The Vardø Blues Festival (Blues i Vintermørket) started (November 14 – 18).
 15 – The 7th Barents Jazz, Tromsø International Jazz Festival started (November 15 – 18).

December
 11 – The Nobel Peace Prize Concert was held at Telenor Arena.

Albums released

January
 27
 The Well by Tord Gustavsen Quartet (ECM Records).
 Klangkammer 1 by Stian Omenås.

February
 10 – The Death Defying Unicorn by Motorpsycho and Ståle Storløkken (Rune Grammofon).

March

April
 27 – Andrea Kvintett by Andrea Rydin Berge.

May
 8 – Reminder by Pixel (Cuneiform Records).
 11
 Cabin Music by Ballrogg
 Northern Arc by Northern Arc

June

July

August
 27 – Neck of the Woods by Marius Neset and Daniel Herskedal (Edition Records).

September
 7 – Atlantis by Elephant9, with Reine Fiske (Rune Grammofon).
 14 – Möya Og Myten by Eplemøya Songlag (Anja Eline Skybakmoen, Liv Ulvik, Wenche Losnegård)

October
 14 – Her Name and Mine – The Oslo Recordings by Fredrik Mikkelsen and Pernille Koch (Little Blue Records).

November
 9 – Dream Logic by Eivind Aarset (ECM Records).
 16 – Noctilucent by Espen Berg (Atterklang – AKLANG306).

December

Unknown date
#

A
 Andrea Kvintett by Andrea Kvintett.

B
 Mari Kvien Brunvoll by Mari Kvien Brunvoll.

W
 Spinnaker by Winther – Storm.

New Artists
 LidoLido received the Spellemannprisen award, as 'Best newcomer of the year 2012', for the album Pretty Girls & Grey Sweaters'' and was with that also recipient of the Gramo grant.
 Mopti was awarded the 2012 'JazzIntro' by the Norwegian Jazz Associations at the Moldejazz, July 17, 2012.

Deaths

January
 4 – Totti Bergh, jazz saxophonist (born 1935).
 31 – Anders Eikås, rock drummer, Honningbarna (car accident) (born 1992).

February
 13 – Nils Grinde, classical organist, musicologist, and theatre historian (born 1927)
 22 – Eivin One Pedersen, jazz accordionist and pianist (born 1956).

March
 15 – Edvard Hagerup Bull, contemporary classical composer (born 1922).

 April
 30 – Finn Benestad, musicologist (born 1929)

May
 13 – Trond Bråthen alias "Trondr Nefas", black metal singer and guitarist, Urgehal (born 1977).

June
 26 – Harry W. Kvebæk, classical trumpeter and academic (born 1925).

November
 3
Anne-Lise Berntsen, operatic soprano singer (born 1943).
Odd Børretzen, author and folk singer, pneumonia (born 1926).
 15 – Frode Thingnæs, jazz trombonist and bandleader, complications from a heart attack (born 1940).
 26 – Per Tveit, classical pianist and composer (born 1951)

See also
 2012 in Norway
 Music of Norway
 Norway in the Eurovision Song Contest 2012

References

 
Norwegian music
Norwegian
Music
2010s in Norwegian music